Right Here Right Now (2003) is a short film written and directed by Mumbai based filmmaker Anand Gandhi. It won critical acclaim and wide audience appreciation in the years following its premiere at the Indo-British Film and Video Festival. It has achieved a near-cult status in the Indian parallel cinema.

Synopsis
 How a one act of bad experience generates the chain of bad experiences.
 How a one act of good experience generates the chain of good experiences.

Cast

 Anuradha Chandan as Mother
 Rupesh Tillu as Rickshawwala
 Tushar Joshi as Uncle
 Trishla Patel as the Girl in love
 Parul Bheda as Maidservant
 Induben Mehta as the Granny

Awards and festivals
 Winner, Best Film (International Short), Syracuse International Film Festival, NY
 Winner, Best Film (Audience Choice Award), shnit shortfilmfestival, Switzerland
 Winner, Best Film of the Year award at the Mocha Film Club, Mumbai
 Official Selection, Tribeca International Film Festival, NY
 Official Selection, Rome International Film Festival
 Official Selection, Indo-British Digital Short Film Festival, India

Music trivia 
 All the soundtracks are original scores composed for the film by Sachin Sanghvi.
 The voices in the songs "Jheeni" & "Red Blossom Cherry" are Sachin Sanghvi, Naresh Iyer and Amit Trivedi.
 "Jheeni" is a modified lyric from the 15th Century mystic poet Kabir's song "Jheeni re chadariya".
 The song "Red Blossom Cherry" is inspired from a Zen Story. In the story, a man is being chased by a vicious snake until he reaches the edge of a cliff. He jumps from the fear of the snake, and clings to a tree. There's a landing ground below, but before he can land, he hears a lion's roar from below. The branch he's clinging to starts dangling. In the midst of all this, he spots a Cherry. He plucks it and eats it. The snake of the past, the lion of the future and the cherry of now!

External links 
 
  "Indian Short Film Wins International Award"
  Anand Gandhi's official homepage.
  "Of our time - The Statesman"
  "About the film on filmaholiX"

2003 films
Indian short films
2000s Hindi-language films